KTEX (100.3 FM) is a radio station broadcasting a country music format. Licensed to Mercedes, Texas, United States, the station serves the McAllen, Weslaco, Harlingen, Brownsville, Texas, area.  The station is owned by iHeartMedia. It shares a studio with its sister stations KBFM, KQXX-FM, KHKZ, and KVNS, located close to the KRGV-TV studios in Weslaco, Texas, while its transmitter is located in Bluetown, Texas.

References

External links

TEX
Country radio stations in the United States
Mass media in Brownsville, Texas
Radio stations established in 1980
IHeartMedia radio stations